D47 is a state road in central Croatia connecting Lipik, Novska and Una River valley area to Croatian motorway network at the A3 motorway Novska interchange and to the D6 state road in Dvor.

The road, as well as all other state roads in Croatia, is managed and maintained by Hrvatske ceste, state owned company.

Traffic volume 

Traffic is regularly counted and reported by Hrvatske ceste, operator of the road.

Road junctions and populated areas

Maps

Sources

D047
D047
D047